Sierra Grande Airport is a public use airport  northeast of Sierra Grande (es), a town in the  Río Negro Province of Argentina.

See also

Transport in Argentina
List of airports in Argentina

References

External links 
OpenStreetMap - Sierra Grande Airport
 OurAirports - Sierra Grande Airport

Airports in Argentina
Río Negro Province